Alexander William Cochrane (born 21 April 2000) is an English professional footballer who plays as a defender for Scottish Premiership club Heart of Midlothian. He has previously played for Brighton & Hove Albion, East Grinstead Town and Union SG.

Career

Brighton & Hove Albion  
Cochrane started his career with  Brighton & Hove Albion, and was loaned to Isthmian League South side East Grinstead in the January transfer market of 2018. He made his professional debut for Brighton on 25 September 2019, in a 3–1 defeat at home against Aston Villa in the EFL Cup. Cochrane was named in the match day squad in the Premier League on 20 July 2020 in a 0–0 home draw against Newcastle United, he remained an unused substitute. On 23 September 2020, Cochrane made his first appearance for the senior side in almost a year coming on as a late substitute in a 2–0 away win over Preston in the EFL Cup.

On 5 October 2020, Cochrane joined Belgian First Division B side Union SG on a season-long loan deal. On 5 February 2021, it was announced that Cochrane had suffered an injury which would keep him out for the rest of the season.

Heart of Midlothian
On 28 June 2021, Cochrane joined Scottish Premiership side Heart of Midlothian on a season-long loan from Brighton. He made his competitive debut two weeks later, playing 83 minutes of the 2–0 away win over Peterhead in the Scottish League Cup. On 31 July, he made his Scottish Premiership debut on the opening day of the 2021–22 season where he played the whole match of the 2–1 home victory over Celtic. Cochrane scored his first professional goal adding Hearts' third in a 3–0 home victory over Livingston on 25 September. He scored his second goal for the club on 6 November, in which he also claimed an assist in the 5–2 home victory over Dundee United. On 21 May 2022, Cochrane started and played 100 minutes of the 2022 Scottish Cup final which ended in a 2–0 after-extra-time defeat against Rangers at Hampden Park.

Cochrane signed a permanent deal with Hearts on 25 June 2022.

International career
Cochrane made one appearance for the England U16's assisting a goal in a 3–3 draw against the United States U15's.

He made his international debut for the England U20s on 19 November 2019 during a 3–0 win over Iceland U21s at Wycombe Wanderers.

Career statistics

Honours

Royale Union Saint-Gilloise

Belgian First Division B: 2020–21

Heart of Midlothian 

Scottish Cup runner-up: 2021–22

References

2000 births
Living people
English footballers
Association football midfielders
Brighton & Hove Albion F.C. players
English expatriate footballers
Expatriate footballers in Belgium
English expatriate sportspeople in Belgium
Royale Union Saint-Gilloise players
Challenger Pro League players
Heart of Midlothian F.C. players
Footballers from Brighton
Scottish Professional Football League players